St. James Episcopal Church is Oklahoma's oldest Episcopal church still in use. It was constructed in 1894 and listed on the National Register of Historic Places May 11, 1982.

References

Episcopal churches in Oklahoma
Churches on the National Register of Historic Places in Oklahoma
Buildings and structures in Wagoner County, Oklahoma
Churches completed in 1894
19th-century Episcopal church buildings
National Register of Historic Places in Wagoner County, Oklahoma